The University of Yangon (also Yangon University; , ; formerly Rangoon College, Rangoon University and Rangoon Arts and Sciences University), located in Kamayut, Yangon, is the oldest university in Myanmar's modern education system and the best known university in Myanmar. The university offers mainly undergraduate and postgraduate degrees (Bachelor's, Master's, Post-graduate Diploma, and Doctorate) programs in liberal arts, sciences and law. Full-time bachelor's degrees were not offered at the university's main campus after the student protests of 1996. The bachelor's degree was re-offered from 2014 on. Today degrees in Political Science are offered to undergraduate students, as well as postgraduate diplomas in areas such as social work and geology.

Initially most major universities in the country depended on Yangon University. Until 1958 when Mandalay University became an independent university, all institutions of higher education in Myanmar were under Yangon University. After the University Education Act of 1964, all professional colleges and institutes of the university such as the Institute of Medicine 1, Rangoon Institute of Technology and Yangon Institute of Economics became independent universities, leaving the Yangon University with liberal arts, sciences and law. In Myanmar, responsibility for higher education depends on various ministries. The University of Yangon depends from the Ministry of education.

Yangon University has been at the centre of civil discontent throughout its history. All three nationwide strikes against the British administration (1920, 1936 and 1938) began at Rangoon University. Leaders of the Burmese independence movement such as General Aung San, U Nu, Ne Win and U Thant are some of the notable alumni of the university. The tradition of student protest at the university continued in the post-colonial era—in 1962, 1974, 1988 and in 1996.

History
Established in 1878 as an affiliated college of the University of Calcutta, the Rangoon College was operated and managed by the Education Syndicate set up by the British colonial administration. The college was renamed Government College in 1904, and University College in 1920. Rangoon University was founded in 1920, when University College (Rangoon College - secular) and Judson College (Baptist-affiliated) were merged by the University of Rangoon Act. The American Baptist Mission decided to recognize Judson College (formerly Baptist College) as a separate institution within Rangoon University. Rangoon University modelled itself after University of Cambridge and University of Oxford. All subsequent institutions of higher learning founded by the British were placed under Rangoon University's administration: Mandalay College in Mandalay in 1925, Teachers Training College and Medical College in Yangon in 1930, and Agriculture College in Mandalay in 1938.

Although it was attended only by the elites of the day, the university was at the centre of the Burmese independence movement. Students protested against the British administration's control of the university and the Rangoon Act which placed the governor as chancellor of the University of Rangoon. All three nationwide strikes against the British colonial government (1920, 1936 and 1938) began at the university. National Day in fact commemorates the rebellion of Burmese students at Rangoon University in 1920. By the 1930s the university was the hotbed of Burmese nationalism, producing a number of future senior Burmese politicians, including General Aung San, U Nu, Ba Maw, Kyaw Nyein, Ba Swe, U Thant and Thein Pe Myint.

Rangoon University became one of the most prestigious universities in Southeast Asia and one of the top universities in Asia, attracting students from across the region. The Japanese occupied the university during the Second World War, but it recovered and flourished after Burma gained independence in 1948. This golden period ended in 1962.

After the military coup of 1962 under General Ne Win, and under the Burmese Way to Socialism, Rangoon University was put directly under the control of the Directorate of Higher Education, a central government agency, whereas previously it was run by a council of professors, scholars and government officials. In addition, the medium of instruction was changed to Burmese, a radical departure from English, which had been the university's medium of instruction since its founding. Educational standards began to decline markedly, and international bodies ceased to recognize degrees issued or obtained at the university. The university was also renamed the Rangoon Arts and Sciences University (abbreviated RASU), after certain departments and faculties (medicine, economics, education, etc.) were separated from the university in 1964.

Rangoon University students staged a peaceful demonstration and protest on campus against 'unjust university rules' on 7 July 1962. Ne Win sent his troops to disperse the students. Dozens of students were killed and the historic Rangoon University Student Union (RUSU) was reduced to rubble the next morning.

In November 1974 the former UN Secretary General U Thant died, and on the day of his funeral on 5 December 1974, Rangoon University students snatched his coffin on display at the Kyaikkasan Race Course, and erected a makeshift mausoleum on the grounds of the RUSU in protest against the government for not honouring their famous countryman with a state funeral. The military stormed the campus on 11 December killing some of the students, recovered the coffin, and buried U Thant at the foot of the Shwedagon Pagoda.

Student protests against protest against General Ne Win's socialist government culminated in 1988. Student protest in March 1988 was met with a violent response from the government. This did not stop the protests. On 8 August 1988, students around the country came together to protest against the military regime. The protest was supported by hundreds of thousands of people who went into the street in protest against the military rule. This is today remembered at the 8888 uprising. The movement was crushed by the army Chief of Staff General Saw Maung who took over and instated the State Law and Order Restoration Council (SLORC or na wa ta). It is estimated that more than 300 students died in the protests. In the months and years that followed, many more were imprisoned.

In 1989, the military junta changed place names throughout Myanmar; the university was renamed the University of Yangon. The university was closed for most of the 1990s, because of fears of a repeat of the 8888 Uprising. To prevent students from congregating, the government dispersed the existing institutions and departments that made up Yangon University into separate learning institutions scattered throughout the city. Till 2013 only graduate studies, certain professional courses, and a few diploma courses were conducted at the university's main campus. Newer universities such as Dagon University, University of East Yangon and University of West Yangon were created to cater for undergraduates.

Yangon University celebrated its Diamond Jubilee in a week-long celebration, which began on 1 December 1995. The Jubilee marked the school's formal establishment of 75 years. For its commemoration, the government built the Diamond Jubilee Hall, a four-storied building in the university's grounds, which cost Ks.63,00,00,000. A new set of postage stamps was also produced. Once-affiliated institutes and departments (e.g., the Institute of Economics, Yangon which began life as a department at Yangon University), which had already separated, also celebrated.

The transition to a new government in 2011 Myanmar was followed by a renewed focus on education. In 2013, Aung San Suu Kyi was named head of the Yangon University Upgrading and Restoration Committee. In December 2013, the university re-opened for undergraduate students. Initially only 50 undergraduate students were accepted. A controversial National Education Law was enacted in 2014. Under the law the university is managed by the Ministry of Education, who also appoints the university rector.

Campus

Yangon University is located in Yangon, along the southwestern bank of Inya Lake, the largest lake in the city. It is on the corner of Pyay Road and University Avenue Road in Kamayut Township, north of downtown Yangon. The modern campus of Yangon University completed construction in 1920. There are two campuses, namely Main Campus and Hlaing Campus, the former being the most well-known. Judson Church, inside the main campus of the university, is a Baptist church, and like Judson College, named after Adoniram Judson, a 19th-century American missionary who compiled the first Burmese-English dictionary. The main campus also contains a convocation hall.

Housing
The accommodation in Burma is not mixed and the availability is limited. Women's halls have many limited rules whilst men's a few.

Other important buildings
 Arts Building
 Convocation Hall
 Judson Church
 Recreation Centre
 Science Building
 Universities' Central Library
 Universities' Dhamma Hall
 Universities' Sanatorium
 University Diamond Jubilee Hall
 Universities' Hospital
 University of Yangon Library
 University Post Office
 Painters' House

Main Departments
Department of Anthropology
Department of Archaeology
Department of Botany
Department of Chemistry
Department of Computer Studies
Department of English
Department of Geography
Department of Geology
Department of History
Department of Industrial Chemistry
Department of International Relations
Department of Law
Department of Library and Information Studies
Department of Mathematics
Department of Myanmar
Department of Oriental Studies
Department of Philosophy
Department of Physics
Department of Psychology
Department of Zoology.
Department of Biology
Each department offers an undergraduate degree programme. The Department of International Relations offers two: the Bachelor of Arts (international relations) and the Bachelor of Arts (political science).

Programmes
Yangon University offers undergraduate and postgraduate degree programmes. The undergraduate programmes are subdivided into three categories: Arts (B.A.), Sciences (B.Sc.), and Law(LL.B). The choice of different fields of learning takes place in upper secondary school where students choose particular subjects directed towards their tertiary education. Postgraduate degrees are separated into three groups: Doctorates, Master's, and diplomas. Although YU no longer offered the undergraduate degrees owing to the uprising in 1996, it now was reopened for the undergraduate degrees with the name of (COE) what literally means Center of Excellence in 2014 and accepted only 50 selectively excellent students for each field of studies. (Although undergraduate and postgraduate programmes are still available to current days, the recognition of status of international COE of the university has been discontinued.)

Notable alumni

Politics and government
 Aung San: National independence figure and founder of the Tatmadaw, the modern Burmese armed forces, 5th Prime Minister of British Burma
 Aung Thu: Minister of Agriculture 
 Ba Cho: Minister of Information 1946–1947
 Ba Maw: Premier of Burma from 1937 to 1939 and Prime Minister 1943–1945 (period under Japanese Occupation)
 Ba Swe: Prime Minister of Burma 1956–1957
 Ba Win: Minister of Trade 1946–1947
 H. N. Goshal: Communist politician
 Henry Van Thio: 2nd Second Vice President of Myanmar
 Khin Nyunt: Prime Minister of Burma from 2003 to 2004 (did not complete B.Sc. degree)
 Khun Htun Oo: Shan politician
 Kyaw Nyein: Deputy Prime Minister of Burma from 1948 to 1949 and again from 1953 to 1958, 1st Burmese Home Affairs Minister
 Kyi Maung: Former army commander and leader of the National League for Democracy
Ma Saw Sa (Judson College), first Burmese woman physician, suffragist, served in parliament
 Maran Brang Seng: Chairman of the Kachin Independence Organization
 Mahn Win Khaing Than:  2nd Speaker of the Amyotha Hluttaw (2016–)
 Maung Khin: 1st Burmese Chief Justice (1921–1924)
 Maung Maung: President of Burma Aug–Sep 1988, journalist and lawyer
 Maung Maung Kha: Prime minister of Burma 1977–1988
 Myo Thein Gyi: Union Minister of Education of Htin Kyaw's Cabinet
 Myoma U Than Kywe: One of the negotiators of the Panglong Conference in 1947
 Nai Shwe Kyin: Mon civil rights leader and revolutionary
 Ne Win: Chairman of Revolutionary Council, 4th President and 3rd Prime Minister of Burma 
 Ohn Maung: Deputy Minister of Transport 1946–1947
 Pe Khin: Chief architect of the Panglong Agreement
 Shawkat Ali Khan: a framer of the Constitution of Bangladesh
 Thakin Mya: Minister of Home Affairs 1946–1947
 U Nu: 1st Prime Minister of Burma from 1948 to 1956, 1957–1958, 1960–1962
 U Razak: Minister of Education
 U Thant: the third Secretary-General of the United Nations from 1961 to 1971
 Usha Narayanan: First Lady of India from 1997 to 2002
 Win Maung: The third President of the Union of Burma
 Win Myint (MP):  2nd Speaker of the House of Representatives (2016–) and the tenth president of Myanmar

Academia
 Benjamin Peary Pal: B. P. Pal FRS (26 May 1906 – 14 September 1989) was the first Director of Indian Council of Agricultural Research. He was one of the foremost scientists in Wheat genetics and breeding.
 Hla Pe: Linguist, Professor of Burmese language and culture at the University of London (1966– 1980) and one of the compilers of a Burmese-English dictionary
 Hla Myint: Economist and one of the pioneers of development economics
 Htin Aung: Scholar of Burmese culture and history, author of Selections from Burmese Folk Tales, one of the founding fathers of the Association of Southeast Asian Institutions of Higher Learning (ASAIHL)
 Mi Mi Khaing: Scholar and Writer
 Nanda Thein Zan : Writer of texts on philosophy and Buddhism
 Sao Saimong: Scholar and linguist, well known for reformed Shan script 
 Sein Tu: Psychologist
 John Furnivall:  An influential historian of Southeast Asia
 Pessie Madan: Indian leader of the high-technology research and development sector
 Pe Maung Tin: Scholar on Pali and Buddhism
 Pho Kyar: Novelist and education reformist
 Ronald Findlay: Ragnar Nurkse Professor of Economics at Columbia University.
 Sir Taw Sein Ko (1864–1930): Burma's first recorded archaeologist and an interlocutor between King Thibaw and the British administration
 Than Nyun: Economist, educationist and former deputy minister
 Than Tun: Historian
 Thaw Kaung: Librarian and a well-known expert in Asian library science 
 U Myint: Economist
 U Nyun: Economist and Executive Secretary of United Nations Economic and Social Commission for Asia and the Pacific from 1959 – 1973
 Aung Tun Thet : Economist and Management Consultant
 Kyaw Thet: Historian
 Winston Set Aung : Economist and Management Consultant, former Deputy Governor of the Central Bank of Myanmar, incumbent Deputy Minister of the Ministry of Planning and Finance
 Yin Yin Nwe: Geologist and Myanmar's Chief Education Adviser to Myanmar President Thein Sein.

Business
 Khin Maung Aye: Chairman of CB Bank and Chairman of Myanmar Banks Association
 Lim Chin Tsong: A tycoon in the early 20th century and a member of the Legislative Council of Burma
 Michael Moe Myint: Founder of Myint & Associates and Myanmar Petroleum Resources Limited (MPRL)
 Zaw Zaw: Founder of Max Myanmar and vice president of Asian Football Confederation (AFC)

Arts and literature 
 Ba Gale: Cartoonist
 Kyi Aye : Poet and writer (also a medical doctor)
 Collegian Ne Win: Film actor
 Khin Myo Chit: Writer and journalist
 Kyi Soe Tun: Film director
 Than E (Bilat Pyan Than): Singer
 Ludu Daw Amar:  Leader of the Rangoon University students strike of 1936, writer and journalist
 Min Thu Wun:Mon-Burmese scholar and poet
 Mya Than Tint : Novelist, Translator
 Saya Zawgyi: Writer and part of the Khit-San literary movement (did not complete degree)
 Thein Pe Myint: Writer, journalist and secretary general of Communist Party of Burma
 Theippan Maung Wa: Writer and part of the Khit-San literary movement in the 1930s
 Maung Htin: Writer and part of Khit-San literary movement
 Myo Min (Ngwe Soe): Writer and part of Khit-San literary movement
 Tin Maung: Film actor and director
 Wah Wah Win Shwe: Actress
 Nwe Yin Win: Singer
 K Ja Nu: Singer
 Kyaw Thu: Actor and chairman of Free Funeral Service Society
 May Sweet: Singer and actress
 Zaw Win Htut: Rock singer
 Sin Yaw Mg Mg: Film director
 Graham: Singer

See also

References

External links 

 

Educational institutions established in 1878
Universities and colleges in Yangon
Arts and Science universities in Myanmar
ASEAN University Network
1878 establishments in Burma